Rockford Elk's Lodge #64 is a historic building in Rockford, Illinois, United States originally used by a chapter of the Benevolent and Protective Order of Elks. It is individually listed on the National Register of Historic Places and is also part of the West Downtown Rockford Historic District.

History
The first Benevolent and Protective Order of Elks chapter in Rockford, Illinois was founded in 1887. They met until they disbanded in 1893. In 1901, the group re-organized and was granted a charter as lodge #64 the next year. They originally met in the Winnedbago Lodge Room of the Nelson House hotel. In 1908, Phillip Smith appointed a committee to examine the possibility of constructing a permanent home for the organization. In February of the next year, the lodge purchased the lot at the corner of North Main and Peach (now Jefferson) Streets.

Lawrence P. Buck of Chicago was selected as the architect; it is unknown why he was chosen. It was constructed over seventeen months, opening on February 7, 1913. An addition was built in 1929 to house a swimming pool, gymnasium, dining room, and bachelor quarters. The lodge used the building until 1990, when it was sold due to dwindling membership. It sat vacant for fourteen years, when it was donated to The Abilities Center, Goodwill Industries. The building was recognized by the National Park Service with a listing on the National Register of Historic Places on February 28, 2005. On September 5, 2007, the building was also listed as a contributing property to the West Downtown Rockford Historic District.

References

National Register of Historic Places in Winnebago County, Illinois
Buildings and structures completed in 1912
Buildings and structures in Rockford, Illinois
Clubhouses on the National Register of Historic Places in Illinois
1912 establishments in Illinois
Individually listed contributing properties to historic districts on the National Register in Illinois